Eleanor Florence Rathbone (12 May 1872 – 2 January 1946) was an independent British Member of Parliament (MP) and long-term campaigner for family allowance and for women's rights. She was a member of the noted Rathbone family of Liverpool.

Early life
Rathbone was the daughter of the social reformer William Rathbone VI and his second wife, Emily Acheson Lyle. She spent her early years in Liverpool. Her family encouraged her to concentrate on social issues; the family motto was "What ought to be done, can be done." Rathbone went to Kensington High School (now Kensington Prep School), London; and later went to Somerville College, Oxford, over the protests of her mother, and supported by Classics coaching from Lucy Mary Silcox. She studied with tutors outside of Somerville, which at that time did not yet have a Classics tutor, taking Roman History with Henry Francis Pelham, Moral Philosophy with Edward Caird, and Greek History with Reginald Macan. Some of these classes were taken together with Barbara Bradby, a lifelong friend. Rathbone was devoted to her studies, taking little part in the entertainments available to female students such as games, and engaging in limited socialising with male students. Her handwriting was reportedly so poor that she had to dictate her final exam papers to a typist, and she received a result in the Second class. In 1894 she was one of the seven founding members of the "Associated Prigs". This was the unofficial name of the discussion group that met on Sundays evenings. The first meeting was in Edith Marvin's room. They never agreed a name or leader but the group would keep notes and the links established were valuable after they left Somerville. Another founder member was Mildred Pope and other early members were Margery Fry and Hilda Oakeley.

Denied an Oxford degree by her gender, she was one of the steamboat ladies who travelled to Ireland between 1904 and 1907 to receive an ad eundem University of Dublin degree (at Trinity College Dublin). After Oxford, Rathbone worked alongside her father to investigate social and industrial conditions in Liverpool, until he died in 1902. They also opposed the Second Boer War. In 1903 Rathbone published their Report on the results of a Special Inquiry into the conditions of Labour at the Liverpool Docks. In 1905 she assisted in establishing the School of Social Science at the University of Liverpool, where she lectured in public administration. Her connection with the university is still recognised by the Eleanor Rathbone building, lecture theatre and Chair of Sociology.

Local politician and campaigner
In 1897, Rathbone became the Honorary Secretary of the Liverpool Women's Suffrage Society Executive Committee in which she focussed on campaigning for women to get the right to vote.

Rathbone was elected as an independent member of Liverpool City Council in 1909 for the seat of Granby Ward, a position she retained until 1935. She wrote a series of articles to a suffragist magazine The Common Cause.  Rathbone and others, such as Alice Morrissey saw women's participation in religious, political and franchise groups co-operating in Liverpool despite the sometimes violent sectarianism and political divisions of the community at that era. In 1913 with Nessie Stewart-Brown she co-founded the Liverpool Women Citizen's Association to promote women's involvement in political affairs.

At the outbreak of the First World War, Rathbone organised the Town Hall Soldiers' and Sailors' Families Association (today known as SSAFA, the Armed Forces charity) to support wives and dependants of soldiers. Rathbone formed the "1918 Club" in Liverpool (still meeting at the Adelphi Hotel), reputedly the oldest women's forum still meeting.

From 1918 onwards, Rathbone was arguing for a system of family allowances paid directly to mothers. She also opposed violent repression of rebellion in Ireland (see Irish Home Rule movement). She was instrumental in negotiating the terms of women's inclusion in the 1918 Representation of the People Act.

In 1919, when Millicent Fawcett retired, Rathbone took over the presidency of the National Union of Societies for Equal Citizenship (the renamed National Union of Women's Suffrage Societies), and as such was involved oj the creation of the Liverpool Personal Service Society. The organisation that would become the Liverpool Personal Services Society (and later just PSS) was founded in 1919 by Rathbone and social worker Dorothy Keeling. The title 'Liverpool Personal Services Society was not adopted until 1922 but those involved with its creation were Eleanor Rathbone', Keeling, Elizabeth Macadam, and academic Frederic D'Aeth. They saw the need for friendly visiting. The PSS initially faced opposition by other charities who saw them as offering no material help and just another competitor.

She also campaigned for women's rights in India.

She contested the 1922 General Election as an Independent candidate at Liverpool East Toxteth against the sitting Unionist MP and was defeated.

In 1924 in the Disinherited Family, she argued that economic dependence of women was based on the practice of supporting variably-sized families with wages that were paid to men, regardless of whether the men had families or not. Later she exposed insurance regulations that reduced married women's access to unemployment benefits and health insurance.

Westminster politician
Rathbone campaigned for Parliament as a feminist, stating "I am standing as a woman, not because I believe there is any antagonism between men's and women's interests but because I believe there is need in the House of Commons for more women who can represent directly the special experience and point of view of women."

In 1929 Rathbone entered parliament as an independent MP for the Combined English Universities. One of her first speeches was about what is now known as female genital mutilation in Kenya, then a British colony. During the Depression, she campaigned for cheap milk and better benefits for the children of the unemployed. In 1931 she helped to organise the defeat of a proposal to abolish the university seats in the parliament and won re-election in 1935.

Rathbone realised the nature of Nazi Germany and in the 1930s joined the British Non-Sectarian Anti-Nazi Council to support human rights.
 
In 1934, she become the leader of the Children's Minimum Committee which was constituted after the BMA Nutrition Report to sensitize the public opinion about the "wide discrepancy" existing "the cost of a satisfactory diet and the actual sums available to poorly paid or unemployed parents for the nourishment of their children."
In 1936 she began to warn about a Nazi threat to Czechoslovakia. She also favoured rearmament and argued for its necessity in the Manchester Guardian.

She became an outspoken critic of appeasement in Parliament. She denounced British complacency in Hitler's remilitarisation of the Rhineland, the Italian conquest of Abyssinia and about the Spanish Civil War. Once she tried to hire a ship to run the blockade of Spain and remove Republicans at risk from reprisals.
Her determination was such that junior ministers and civil servants of the Foreign Office would reputedly duck behind pillars when they saw her coming. She supported the points of Winston Churchill and Clement Attlee but earned the enmity of Neville Chamberlain.

In 1936, Rathbone was one of several people who supported the British Provisional Committee for the Defence of Leon Trotsky, and signed a letter to the Manchester Guardian defending Trotsky's right to asylum and calling for an international inquiry into the Moscow Trials. While she advocated for gender difference, during a speech to Parliamentshe said that "those who expect women’s contributions to be something completely sui generis, utterly different from the contribution of men, will be disappointed."

On 30 September 1938, Rathbone denounced the just-publicised Munich Agreement. She pressured the parliament to aid the Czechoslovaks and grant entry for dissident Germans, Austrians and Jews. In late 1938 she set up the Parliamentary Committee on Refugees to take up individual cases from Spain, Czechoslovakia and Germany. During World War II she regularly chastised Osbert Peake, undersecretary at the Home Office, and in 1942 pressured the government to publicise the evidence of the Holocaust.

Personal life
At the end of the First World War, Rathbone and the social work campaigner Elizabeth Macadam bought a house in London together. The two friends continued to share the house until Rathbone's sudden death in January 1946.

Rathbone was a first cousin once-removed of the actor Basil Rathbone. Her nephew John Rankin Rathbone was the Conservative MP for Bodmin from 1935 until his death in the Battle of Britain, 1940, when his wife Beatrice succeeded him as MP. Her great-nephew Tim Rathbone was Conservative MP for Lewes from 1974 to 1997.

Her great-niece, Jenny Rathbone, was a Labour councillor in Islington and later was the Parliamentary Candidate for the Labour Party in the South Wales constituency of Cardiff Central at the 2010 General Election. She was elected to the National Assembly for Wales as representative for Cardiff Central in the 2011 National Assembly elections.

Legacy

In 1945, the year before her death, Eleanor Rathbone saw the Family Allowances Act pass into law.

In 1986, a blue plaque was erected for her by Greater London Council at Tufton Court, Tufton Street, Westminster, London SW1P 3QH, City of Westminster, where she had lived.

Her name and picture (and those of 58 other women's suffrage supporters) are on the plinth of the statue of Millicent Fawcett in Parliament Square, London, unveiled in 2018.

The University of Liverpool acknowledges Rathbone by way of its Eleanor Rathbone Building; the site houses the School of Law and Social Justice and the Dept of Psychology, as well as the Eleanor Rathbone Theatre used for stage productions and musical performances. Edge Hill University has a hall of residence called Eleanor Rathbone in honour of her work as a social reformer.

See also
History of feminism
List of suffragists and suffragettes
Women's suffrage in the United Kingdom
Refugees
Rescue of Jews

References

Further reading
Susan Pedersen, Eleanor Rathbone and the Politics of Conscience (2004)
Ray Strachey, Our freedom and its results, (1936), chapter by E. Rathbone
Susan Pedersen, ‘Rathbone, Eleanor Florence (1872–1946)’, Oxford Dictionary of National Biography, online edn, May 2006, accessed 1 March 2007
Susan Cohen (historian) Rescue the Perishing. Eleanor Rathbone and the Refugees (2010)
Eleanor Rathbone by Mary D. Stocks (1949)

External links
Eleanor Rathbone Trust

Portrait of Eleanor Rathbone in the UK Parliamentary Collections

Archives
The archive of Eleanor Rathbone is held at the University of Liverpool's Special Collections & Archives. Other papers are held at The Women's Library at the Library of the London School of Economics, ref  7ELR

1872 births
1946 deaths
Members of the Parliament of the United Kingdom for the Combined English Universities
Independent politicians in England
Alumni of Somerville College, Oxford
British suffragists
Female members of the Parliament of the United Kingdom for English constituencies
Independent members of the House of Commons of the United Kingdom
UK MPs 1929–1931
UK MPs 1931–1935
UK MPs 1935–1945
UK MPs 1945–1950
Feminism and history
Eleanor
Politicians from Liverpool
20th-century British women politicians
Steamboat ladies